Mar Abascal (born 1980) is a Spanish actress, born in the city of Madrid. She is known for Spanish comedy television series Gym Tony.

Career 
In 1995, Abascal performed in Zarzuela shows, named as La Magica de la Zarzuela.  In 2008, she starred in My first time (2008–2011) by Ken Davenport, along with Javi Martín and Miren Ibarguren. Between December 2014 and April 2016 she was a part of the cast of the television comedy Gym Tony in the role of Pilar Macias.

Filmography

Television series

Television programs

Theaters

Short films

References

External links 
 

1980 births
Living people
Actresses from Madrid
Spanish television actresses
Spanish film actresses
21st-century Spanish actresses